Don George (born c. 1934) is a former Canadian football player who played for the BC Lions. He played college football at the University of Notre Dame.

References

External links

1930s births
Living people
Players of American football from Pennsylvania
American football tackles
Canadian football tackles
American players of Canadian football
Notre Dame Fighting Irish football players
BC Lions players
People from Washington County, Pennsylvania